Leslie County is located in the U.S. state of Kentucky. Its county seat is Hyden. Leslie is a prohibition or dry county.

History
Leslie County was founded in 1878. It was named for Preston H. Leslie, Governor of Kentucky (1871-1875).

The Hurricane Creek mine disaster in a Leslie County coal mine in 1970 killed 38 people.

After resigning the presidency, Richard Nixon made his first public appearance, in July 1978, at the Leslie County dedication of a recreation facility named for him. County Judge-Executive C. Allen Muncy claimed the Nixon invitation prompted the U.S. Department of Justice to obtain indictments of him and his associates on vote-fraud charges; while on appeal for his conviction, he won renomination in the Republican primary but lost the 1981 general election to independent Kermit Keen.

Geography

Adjacent counties
 Perry County  (northeast)
 Harlan County  (southeast)
 Bell County  (southwest)
 Clay County  (west)

Demographics

As of the census of 2000, there were 12,401 people, 4,885 households, and 3,668 families residing in the county. The racial makeup of the county was  97.18% White, 0.07% Black or African American, 0.09% Native American, 0.12% Asian, 0.02% Pacific Islander, 0.05% from other races, and 0.50% from two or more races; 0.62% of the population were Hispanic or Latino of any race.

There were 4,885 households, out of which 35.50% had children under the age of 18 living with them, 58.30% were married couples living together, 12.90% had a female householder with no husband present, and 24.90% were non-families. 22.40% of all households were made up of individuals, and 8.70% had someone living alone who was 65 years of age or older.  The average household size was 2.52 and the average family size was 2.94.

In the county, the population was spread out, with 24.60% under the age of 18, 9.20% from 18 to 24, 30.90% from 25 to 44, 23.90% from 45 to 64, and 11.50% who were 65 years of age or older.  The median age was 36 years. For every 100 females there were 95.10 males.  For every 100 females age 18 and over, there were 91.20 males.

The median income for a household in the county was $18,546, and the median income for a family was $22,225. Males had a median income of $28,708 versus $18,080 for females. The per capita income for the county was $10,429.  About 30.20% of families and 32.70% of the population were below the poverty line, including 38.80% of those under age 18 and 27.00% of those age 65 or over.

Life expectancy and health
Of 3,142 counties in the United States in 2014, the Institute for Health Metrics and Evaluation ranked Leslie County 3,120 in the average life expectancy at birth of male residents and 3,130 in the life expectancy of female residents. Life expectancy in Leslie county ranked in the bottom 10 percent among U.S. counties. Males in Leslie County lived an average of 70.0 years and females lived an average of 74.7 years compared to the national average for life expectancy of 76.7 for males and 81.5 for females. In the 1980-2014 period, the average life expectancy in Leslie County for females decreased by 4.0 years while male longevity decreased by 0.1 years compared to the national average for the same period of an increased life expectancy of 4.0 years for women and 6.7 years for men. Factors contributing to the short, and declining, life expectancy of residents of Leslie county included obesity, smoking, and low amounts of exercise.

In 2020, the Robert Wood Johnson Foundation ranked Leslie country 107 of 120 counties in Kentucky in "health outcomes," as measured by length and quality of life.

Economy

Coal companies in Leslie County
 James River Coal Company

Infrastructure

Transportation
Public transportation is provided by LKLP Community Action Partnership with demand-response service and scheduled service from Hyden to Hazard.

Communities

 Asher
 Bear Branch
 Big Rock
 Causey
 Chappell
 Cinda
 Confluence
 Cutshin
 Essie
 Frew
 Grassy
 Hare
 Hell for Certain
 Helton
 Hoskinston
 Hyden (county seat)
 Kaliopi
 Middlefork
 Mozelle
 Roark
 Sizerock
 Smilax
 Stinnett
 Thousandsticks
 Toulouse
 Warbranch
 Wendover
 Wooton
 Yeaddis

Politics
Leslie County is one of forty-four United States counties to have never voted for a Democratic presidential candidate since its creation in 1878. In 1892, 1908, and 1916 it was the most Republican county in the nation. Leslie's fierce Unionist sympathies, so strong that areas surrounding it contributed more troops to the Union Army relative to population than any other part of the United States, meant that between 1896 and 1928 no Democrat could receive even ten percent of the county's vote, and none received so much as twenty-five percent until Lyndon Johnson managed over 47 percent in his landslide national triumph against Barry Goldwater in 1964.

Despite Goldwater's relatively poor performance, every Republican candidate since the county's formation has obtained an absolute majority in Leslie County, and only William Howard Taft in the divided 1912 election, George H. W. Bush in 1992, and Bob Dole in 1996 have otherwise received under seventy percent for the GOP. Both Mitt Romney and Donald Trump received almost ninety percent of the vote in this county, making Leslie the strongest GOP county in Kentucky (see chart below).

See also

 Dry counties
 National Register of Historic Places listings in Leslie County, Kentucky

References

Notes

External links
 The Kentucky Highlands Project
 LeslieCounty.Net - oldest and largest site dealing with Leslie County

 
Kentucky counties
Counties of Appalachia
1878 establishments in Kentucky
Populated places established in 1878